Hoarafushi (Dhivehi: ހޯރަފުށި ) is an inhabited island of Haa Alif Atoll, Maldives, and is geographically part of the Ihavandhippolhu Atoll. The island is famous for its scenic attractions. Hoarafushi Airport was established in  2020. It is an island-level administrative constituency governed by the Hoarafushi Island Council.

History

According to the 1912 census, Hoarafushi was the fourth-largest locality in the Maldives, with a population of 1,811. The island used to be an educational hub. The people of Hoarafushi claim to have originated from Gudhanfushi, a vanished island adjacent to Huvahandhoo in the same reef. The population moved to Huvuhandhoo as Gudhanfushi eroded away before moving onto Hoarafushi. In 2006 the inhabitants of Berinmadhoo were relocated to Hoarafushi.

Geography
Hoarafushi is located at the northern most Ihavandhippolhu Atoll. The island is situated within the largest fringing reef of Maldives extending over 22 km. Hoarafushi consist of 3 islands naturally joined the main island Hoarafushi adjacent to Bodufinolhu connected in the late (1700) and Kudafinolhu in (2013). The island has a land area of 105 hectares.  north of the country's capital, Malé.

Population

Education
The Hoarafushi island has 4 well known educational institutions.
 H.a Atoll School (ހ.އ އަތޮޅު މަދަރުސާ), a government manipulated educational institution. (LKG to Grade 12)
 Adam Saleem Hadhaanee Pre-school (އާދަމް ސަލީމް ހަދާނީ ޕްރީ ސްކޫލް), Private. (Kindergarten)
 Thauleemul Bayaan (ތައުލީމުލް ބަޔާން), a private educational institution mainly focused on Qur'an Studies.
 Novel Institute of Technology offers IT courses

References

External links
Isles Profile - Hoarafushi

Islands of the Maldives